Tyhee is a census-designated place in Bannock County, Idaho, United States.  Its population was 1,123 as of the 2010 census.

The community was named after a Bannock Indian chieftain.

Demographics

Education
Tyhee is in the Pocatello/Chubbuck School District. Residents are zoned to Tyhee and Ellis Elementary Schools in Tyhee, Hawthorne Middle School in Pocatello, and Highland High School in Pocatello.

References

Census-designated places in Bannock County, Idaho
Census-designated places in Idaho